Sarabia may refer to:

People
Álvaro Sarabia (born 1978), Chilean footballer
Daniel Sarabia (born 1984), Cuban ballet dancer
Eder Sarabia (born 1980), Spanish football manager and former player
Francisco Antolínez de Sarabia (born 1644), Spanish painter
Ignacio Sarabia (born 1983), Mexican cyclist
Jesús Sarabia (born 1946), Mexican cyclist
José Enrique Sarabia (born 1940), Venezuelan poet, musician, publicist, and television producer
Manuel Sarabia (born 1957), Spanish retired footballer
Pablo Sarabia (born 1992), Spanish footballer
Pedro Sarabia (born 1975), Paraguay football manager and former player
Rolando Sarabia (born 1982), Cuban ballet dancer
Simeón Cuba Sarabia (1935–1967), member of the Ñancahuazú guerrilla column led by Che Guevara in Bolivia
Víctor Hugo Sarabia (born 1983), Chilean footballer

Places
Sarabia River, river of Mexico
Estación Sarabia, a town in Oaxaca, Mexico
Francisco Sarabia International Airport, international airport in Torreón, Coahuila, Mexico
Francisco Sarabia National Airport, national airport located at Tuxtla Gutiérrez, Chiapas, Mexico

See also
Bessarabia
Sarab (disambiguation)
Sarabian
Sarbia (disambiguation)
Sharabian

gl:Sarabia